Enger is a town in the Herford district, in North Rhine-Westphalia, Germany.

Geography
Enger is situated between the Teutoburg Forest and the Wiehen Hills, approx. 6 km west of the town of Herford, the capital of the district.

Neighbouring places
 Spenge
 Bünde
 Hiddenhausen
 Herford
 Bielefeld

Town divisions 
Enger consists of the following districts (population as of December 31, 2005): 
 Belke-Steinbeck  (2,471 inhabitants)
 Besenkamp  (1,849 inhabitants)
 Dreyen  (1,404 inhabitants)
 Enger (7,809 inhabitants)
 Herringhausen (West) (430 inhabitants)
 Oldinghausen  (773 inhabitants)
 Pödinghausen  (2,181 inhabitants)
 Siele  (122 inhabitants)
 Westerenger  (3,797 inhabitants)

History
 
The town, first mentioned in 948, calls itself "Widukind's town."  The Saxon leader Widukind died about 808. However, there is no evidence that Enger existed in his lifetime.

A legend tells that Widukind founded a church in Enger after his baptism, and that he lived at the place until his death. He was buried in the church of Enger, and his monumental tomb is still there.
Despite this, it remains doubtful that the remains of Widukind are actually in the tomb. Analysis shows that the memorial slab dates to the time around the year 1100.

The main current attractions of Enger are Widukind's tomb, the Widukind museum, the Widukind festival ("Timpkenfest"), held annually on January 6 and the "Kirschblütenfest" in April.

Notable people

 Wolfgang Aßbrock (1952–2007), politician and member of the North Rhine-Westphalian Parliament (2005–2007)
 Wilhelm Müller (1875–1957), politician
 Heinrich Vedder (1876–1972), missionary

References

External links

 Official site 

Herford (district)